FC Zbrojovka Brno is a professional football club based in the city of Brno, South Moravia, Czech Republic and named after Zbrojovka Brno, a firearms manufacturer. Founded in 1913 as SK Židenice, the club later became known as Zbrojovka Brno. Brno won the Czechoslovak First League in the 1977–78 season and finished as runners-up in 1979–80.

History

The club, initially known as SK Židenice, played in the top tier of Czechoslovak football from 1933 until suffering relegation in the 1946–47 Czechoslovak First League. During this period, the club entered the Mitropa Cup three times, reaching the quarter finals in 1935 as well as taking part in the competition in 1936 and 1938.

Between 1950 and 1962 the club played outside the top tier, returning in the 1962–63 Czechoslovak First League. Five seasons elapsed before the club was again relegated, in 1967. They then spent four years in the second tier of Czechoslovak football before returning to the top flight. In the 1970s the club was a strong force in the country, winning the Czechoslovak First League in 1978, finishing third the following season and being runners up in 1980.

The 1980s were less spectacular for Brno, as the club was relegated in 1983, playing until 1989 in the second tier. After just two seasons in the top tier, the club finished last in 1991 and was again relegated.

Between 1992 and 2011, Brno played in the top tier of the Czech Republic for 19 consecutive seasons, the longest such spell in the club's history. In 2011, the club was relegated to the second division. In the 2011–12 Czech 2. Liga, the club only managed to finish fourth, missing out on the promotion places. However, due to the stadium requirements of the Czech First League, champions FK Ústí nad Labem as well as third-placed FK Baník Sokolov were ineligible for promotion. As a result, Brno won promotion immediately back to the top tier. In 2018, the club was relegated to the second division. In the 2018–19 Czech Second League, the club managed to finish third but lost the promotion play-off to Příbram.

Historical names
 SK Židenice (1913–47)
 Zbrojovka Židenice Brno (1947–51)
 Zbrojovka Brno (1951–56)
 Spartak ZJŠ Brno (1956–68)
 Zbrojovka Brno (1968–92)
 Boby Brno (1992–2000)
 Stavo Artikel Brno (2000–02)
 1. FC Brno (2002–10)
 Zbrojovka Brno (2010–)
In 1962, there was an amalgamation between Rudá Hvězda Brno (1956–62) and Spartak ZJŠ Brno.

European competitions
Brno have competed a number of times in European competitions, reaching the second round of the 1978–79 European Cup in their only appearance to date in the competition. The club played in the 1993–94 European Cup Winners' Cup but lost in the first round.

Brno took part in the UEFA Cup three times, reaching the quarter finals in 1979–80 and also playing in 1980–81 and 1997–98.

Because Brno was a major fairs city of Czechoslovakia, teams from Brno played in the Inter-Cities Fairs Cup in the 1960s. It was Spartak KPS Brno who participated first, then Spartak ZJŠ Brno (Zbrojovka) played five times in the Inter-Cities Fairs Cup in a row, reaching the quarter finals in 1963–64.

Brno (then SK Židenice) competed in the Mitropa Cup three times before World War II, reaching the quarter finals in 1935.

Rudá Hvězda Brno played in the 1960–61 European Cup Winners' Cup, reaching the quarter finals, after winning Czechoslovak Cup in 1960.

Stadium

Brno have played at Městský fotbalový stadion Srbská since 2001, when they moved from previous home Stadion Za Lužánkami. In the 1990s, Brno attracted record crowds to their football matches, with Za Lužánkami as the venue for all of the top ten most-attended Czech First League matches. The highest attendance for a Brno match is 44,120, set in a league match against Slavia Prague.

Players

Current squad
.

Out on loan

Reserve squad
To see Zbrojovka Brno's reserve squad, go to FC Zbrojovka Brno B

Notable former players

Oldřich Rulc
Vlastimil Bubník
Karel Lichtnégl
Ján Popluhár
Rostislav Václavíček
Karel Kroupa
Karel Jarůšek
Petr Janečka
Roman Kukleta
René Wagner
Richard Dostálek
Jan Maroši
Milan Pacanda

Some of the biggest Czech football legends played for Brno briefly:
Karel Pešek (at the end of career)
Josef Bican (at the end of career, as playing manager)
Ivo Viktor (at the beginning of career)

Player records in the Czech First League
.
Highlighted players are in the current squad.

Most appearances

Most goals

Most clean sheets

Current technical staff

Managers

Václav Vohralík (1926–1934)
Jenö Konrád (1934–1935)
Antonín Carvan (1935–1938)
Josef Kuchynka (1938–1941)
Vlastimil Borecký (1941–1942)
Josef Smolka (1942–1943)
Josef Eremiáš (1943–1946)
Matthias Kaburek (1947)
Josef Eremiáš (1947–1948)
Jan Smolka (1948–1949)
Josef Košťálek (1950)
Josef Eremiáš (1951–1952)
Eduard Farda (1953–1957)
Josef Bican (1957)
Josef Machata (1958)
František Čejka (1958–1959)
Svatoslav Vrbka (1960)
František Zapletal (1960–1962)
Rudolf Krčil (1962)
Alfréd Sezemský (1963)
František Zapletal (1964)
Karel Kolský (1964–1966)
Karel Nepala (1966–1967)
František Čejka (1967)
Josef Jaroš (1967)
Karel Kohlík (1967)
Vratislav Dittrich (1967–1968)
Theodor Reimann (1968–1969)
Zdeněk Hajský (1969–1971)
Alfréd Sezemský (1972)
František Havránek (1972–1976)
Josef Masopust (1976–1980)
Valér Švec (1980–1981)
Karel Brückner (1981–1983)
Josef Bouška (1983)
Viliam Padúch (1984)
Ján Zachar (1984–1985)
Ivan Hrdlička (1985–1987)
Rudolf Skarka (1987)
Petr Pálka (1987–1988)
František Harašta (1988)
František Cipro (1989–1990)
Viliam Padúch (1990)
Karol Dobiaš (1990–1993)
Josef Masopust (1993)
Vladimír Táborský (1993–1994)
Karel Večeřa (1994)
Petr Uličný (1994–1996)
Karel Večeřa (1996–1998)
Karel Jarůšek (1998–2000)
Pavel Tobiáš (2000–2001)
Karel Večeřa (2001–2003)
Karel Jarůšek (2004–2005)
Jiří Kotrba (2005)
Josef Mazura (2005–2007)
Petr Uličný (2007–2008)
Aleš Křeček (2008)
Miroslav Beránek (2008–2010)
Karel Večeřa (July 2010 – June 2011)
René Wagner (July 2011 – Oct 2011)
Róbert Kafka (Oct 2011 – Dec 2011)
Petr Čuhel (Jan 2012 – Apr 2013)
Ludevít Grmela (Apr 2013 – Sept 2013)
Václav Kotal (Sept 2013 – June 2016)
Svatopluk Habanec (June 2016 – Aug 2017)
Richard Dostálek (Aug 2017 – Oct 2017)
Roman Pivarník (Oct 2017 – Aug 2018)
Pavel Šustr (Aug 2018 – Oct 2019)
Miloslav Machálek (Oct 2019 – Dec 2020)
Richard Dostálek (Dec 2020 – )

History in domestic competitions

 Seasons spent at Level 1 of the football league system: 39
 Seasons spent at Level 2 of the football league system: 9
 Seasons spent at Level 3 of the football league system: 0
 Seasons spent at Level 4 of the football league system: 0

Czech Republic

Honours
Czechoslovak First League
Winners (1): 1977–78
Runners-up (1): 1979–80
3rd Place (4): 1934–35, 1937–38, 1945–46, 1978–79
Czech First League
3rd Place (1): 1994–95
Czechoslovak Amateur League
Winners (1): 1926
Czechoslovak Cup
Winners (1): 1959–60 (Rudá Hvězda)
Czech Cup
Runners-up (1): 1992–93

Club records

Czech First League records
Best position: 3rd (1994–95)
Worst position: 16th (2017–18)
Biggest home win: Brno 7–0 Slovácko (2010–11)
Biggest away win: Olomouc 0–3 Brno (1993–94), Teplice 1–4 Brno (2017–18)
Biggest home defeat: Brno 0–5 Sparta Prague (2010–11)
Biggest away defeat: Slavia Prague 6–0 Brno (1993–94), Sparta Prague 6–0 Brno (2001–02)

References

External links
 

 
Football clubs in the Czech Republic
Association football clubs established in 1913
Czechoslovak First League clubs
Czech First League clubs
Football clubs in Czechoslovakia
1913 establishments in Austria-Hungary
20th-century establishments in Bohemia